The Pacuma toadfish (Batrachoides surinamensis) is a species of toadfish found in the Caribbean Sea and Atlantic Ocean along the coasts of Central and South America from Honduras to Brazil. This fish is found in local commercial fisheries and the aquarium trade.

References

Batrachoides
Fish described in 1801